Vahideh Taleghani is an Iranian politician who represented Tehran, Rey, Shemiranat and Eslamshahr in the Parliament of Iran from 2000 to 2004.

References

1953 births
Living people
Members of the 6th Islamic Consultative Assembly
Deputies of Tehran, Rey, Shemiranat and Eslamshahr
Islamic Iran Participation Front politicians
Members of the Women's fraction of Islamic Consultative Assembly
21st-century Iranian women politicians
21st-century Iranian politicians